The Imperial Decree of declaration of war against foreign powers was a simultaneous declaration of war by the Qing dynasty in 1900 against eleven foreign powers which held varying degrees of influence in China: Russia, the United States, the United Kingdom, Japan, France, Germany, Italy, Spain, Austria-Hungary, Belgium, and the Netherlands. The declaration of war was one of the direct causes of the Boxer Rebellion and the Eight-Nation Alliance's formation, which then led to Boxer Protocol. This Imperial decree was officially issued in the name of Guangxu Emperor, bearing his official Imperial seal. The Emperor of China was in effect under house arrest, ordered by Empress Dowager Cixi at that time, and the full administrative power was in the hand of the Empress Dowager.

The origin of the war
Kang Youwei and Liang Qichao were helping the young Guangxu Emperor to start the Hundred Days' Reform, which was "too fast, too ambitious, and lacked any sense of political reality" and they approached Yuan Shikai's help to stage a military coup to topple the conservative forces of the Manchu Court. Yuan Shikai instead of taking side with the reformers, revealed the plot which included the executions of top conservative powers. Empress Dowager fought back by putting the young emperor under house arrest and regained the power at the Court. The Great Powers then showed their support for the emperor,  Dowager Cixi fearing that the Guangxu Emperor might fight back with the help of foreigners, issued a royal decree of declaration of war against all eleven of the then Great Powers.

Motivation for declaring war

See also
Imperial decree on events leading to the signing of Boxer Protocol

References

Boxer Rebellion
Declarations of war
Foreign relations of the Qing dynasty
Qing dynasty Imperial Decrees
1900 in China